Hazen Kimball (February 19, 1835 - June 22, 1890) was an American merchant, banker, and politician who served as the tenth Mayor of Hoboken, New Jersey, from 1869 to 1871. Kimball was vice president of the First National Bank of Hoboken and president of the Gansevoort Bank of New York.

Biography
He was born on February 19, 1835, in Barton, Vermont.

He served as the tenth Mayor of Hoboken, New Jersey, from 1869 to 1871. Prior to the 1869 vote concerning consolidation with Jersey City, Kimball asserted the health of his city: "Hoboken keeps pace at least, if it does not goes beyond, our sister cities in rapid increase of population and wealth." Unlike Bergen City and Hudson City, Hoboken chose to remain independent.

He was vice president of the First National Bank of Hoboken and president of the Gansevoort Bank of New York.

He died on June 22, 1890, of apoplexy in Hoboken, New Jersey.

References

1835 births
1890 deaths
Mayors of Hoboken, New Jersey
People from Barton, Vermont
19th-century American politicians